The Complexo Desportivo Conde de Sucena (meaning in English "Count of Sucena Sports Complex") is located in Sintra and is the home of the S.U. 1º Dezembro football club.

History
After the board of the S.U. 1º Dezembro decided to expand its sports activities to include football, the then Count of Sucena granted the club some land in 1935. The Sports Complex has been located in that piece of land ever since it being granted and all the club's activities are performed there on a daily basis.

The Complex is located at the base of the Sintra Mountains, making for a rainy, cold and humid climate, with fog being a common occurrence.

Facilities
The Sports Complex consists of the following:
 Campo Conde de Sucena (in English, "Count of Sucena Field") is the main one, fit for 11-a-side matches. It is used by all the 11-a-side teams of the club and is often temporarily fitted for 7-a-side official matches;
 Field nr. 2, a 5-a-side artificial turf field;
 Field nr. 3, a 7-a-side artificial turf field, inaugurated in 2011 and is used for unofficial matches;
 A restaurant/bar.

Tenants
 S.U. 1º Dezembro
 S.U. 1º Dezembro (women)
 Sevenfoot
 Abrunheira-URCA

See also
 Campo Conde de Sucena
 S.U. 1º Dezembro
 S.U. 1º Dezembro (women)
 Sevenfoot

External links
 Conde de Sucena Field at Zerozero.pt Website
 Official Facebook Page
 Official Website

References

Conde de Sucena
S.U. 1º Dezembro
Sports venues in Lisbon District
Buildings and structures in Sintra
Sport in Sintra
Sports venues completed in 1935